Ferran Velazco i Querol (born Barcelona, 23 June 1976) is a Spanish rugby union player. He plays as a fullback.

Velazco played for UE Santboiana since his youth, except for a five-year stint with El Salvador Rugby between 2002 and 2005, where he won the Spanish Championship for five times, in 9195/96, 1996/97, 2002/03, 2003/04 and 2005/06.

He had 57 caps for Spain, from 1997 to 2006, scoring 13 tries, 2 conversions, 2 penalties and 2 drop goals, in an aggregate of 87 points. He played two games at the 1999 Rugby World Cup, scoring a penalty in the 47-3 defeat to South Africa. He was also a recurring member in Spain sevens.

External links 
 

1976 births
Living people
Rugby union players from Catalonia
Spanish rugby union players
Rugby union fullbacks
Spain international rugby union players
Sportspeople from Barcelona